Patricia Stevens (née Szczepaniak; September 16, 1945 – May 26, 2010) was an American actress. She is perhaps best known for her various nurse roles, particularly as Nurse Baker on M*A*S*H and her role as the second voice of the character Velma Dinkley on two Saturday morning cartoon series The Scooby-Doo Show and Scooby-Doo and Scrappy-Doo during the same period (1976–1979).

Career
Stevens voiced the character of Velma Dinkley from 1976 to 1979, leaving the show midway through Scooby-Doo and Scrappy-Doo. She appeared on the long-running television series M*A*S*H from 1974 through 1978 as various nurses in 15 non-consecutive episodes. Stevens was first credited as Nurse Mitchell, then Nurse Baker, Nurse Stevens, Nurse Brown and Nurse Able, before appearing again as Nurse Baker in the episode "Margaret's Marriage" in Season Five, and then finally in "Major Ego" during Season Seven, when she was credited as a Duty Nurse.

Personal life and death
Stevens married former 1970s TV character actor Jess Nadelman in 1980; they had two children, Sara and David. According to an obituary published in the Worcester Telegram & Gazette, Stevens later transitioned from acting to teaching, where she worked "with elementary and secondary education teachers, integrating art into the regular curriculum including science and history".

Stevens died from breast cancer on May 26, 2010, at the age of 64 in Rutland, Massachusetts. She was surrounded by her husband, Jess Nadelman, their children, Sara and David, and her six siblings.

Filmography

References

External links

1945 births
2010 deaths
American people of Slavic descent
People from Linden, New Jersey
Actresses from New Jersey
American television actresses
American voice actresses
Deaths from cancer in Massachusetts
Deaths from breast cancer
20th-century American actresses
21st-century American women